The 2019 Midwestern State Mustangs football team represented Midwestern State University in the 2019 NCAA Division II football season. They were led by head coach Bill Maskill, who is in his 18th season at Midwestern State. The Mustangs played their home games at Memorial Stadium and were members of the Lone Star Conference.

Previous season
The Mustangs finished the 2018 season 8–2, 6–1 in Lone Star Conference (LSC) play, to finish third in the conference standings. The 2018 team, were a two point margin away from winning the conference title and competing in the playoffs.

Schedule
Midwestern State announced their 2021 football schedule on March 6, 2019.

References

Midwestern State
Midwestern State Mustangs football seasons
Midwestern State Mustangs football